Leandro Verì (San Vito Chietino, 10 November 1903 – Laigueglia, 13 December 1938) was an Italian carabiniere.

Biography 
Born in San Vito Chietino, Chieti, on 10 November 1903, Verì attended the carabiniere student walking course at the Rome school from April to September 1923. Appointed carabiniere, he was assigned to the Legion of Chieti. In December 1926 he moved to that of Treviso and the following year to that of Padua, from which he was transferred, in May 1930, to the Legion of Rome. Moved in December 1931 to the Legion of Genoa, Nervi's company, six years later he was promoted to the rank of appuntato and sent to the Alassio station.

Verì died on 13 December 1938, while serving in Laigueglia, Savona, after being mortally wounded during a nighttime firefight with a dangerous criminal. For this operation he was decorated posthumously with the Gold Medal of Military Valour by a decree of 18 August 1939.

Honors

Memorials 
 The Arma dei Carabinieri named the 67th Course of Carabinieri Students after Verì, effective in 1982.
 Subsequently, the 133rd and 246th Auxiliary Carabinieri Students Course and the 124th training course for carabinieri were named after him (year 2009).
 The 2nd Course of Brigadier Students at the Scuola marescialli e brigadieri dei carabinieri (School of Marshals and Brigadiers of the Carabinieri) of Velletri (Metropolitan City of Rome Capital), from 1 September to 5 December 1997.
 The municipality of San Vito Chietino has named a small square in the historic center after him.

References

External links 

1903 births
1938 deaths
Carabinieri
Deaths by firearm in Italy
Italian murder victims
Italian police officers killed in the line of duty
Male murder victims
People from the Province of Chieti
People from the Province of Savona
People murdered in Liguria
Recipients of the Gold Medal of Military Valor
20th-century Italian military personnel